Endrien Gugash Magani (born 6 June 1991 in Peqin) is an Albanian footballer who plays for KS Lushnja in the Albanian First Division.

Personal life
He is a son of former Shkumbini Peqin, Besa Kavajë and Partizani Tirana player Gugash Magani, who has also coached Shkumbini Peqin, Besa Kavajë, Teuta Durrës and Tirana. His brother Artur is also a footballer, and is currently at KF Feronikeli.

Ahead of the 2019/20 season, Magani returned to KS Lushnja for the second time.

References

External links

1991 births
Living people
People from Peqin
Association football midfielders
Albanian footballers
KF Gramshi players
KS Shkumbini Peqin players
KF Teuta Durrës players
KS Lushnja players
SC Gjilani players
Kategoria e Parë players
Kategoria Superiore players
Football Superleague of Kosovo players
Albanian expatriate footballers
Expatriate footballers in Kosovo
Albanian expatriate sportspeople in Kosovo